Sikera Valley (‘Dolina Sikera’ \do-li-'na si-'ke-ra\) is an ice-filled valley spanning 17 km long and 5.7 km wide. The valley is located between Doyran Heights and Flowers Hills on the east side of Sentinel Range in Ellsworth Mountains, Antarctica. A nameless steep 4-km side glacier drains northeastwards from Mount Havener in Doyran Heights, and empties into the upper part of the valley, south of Kostinbrod Pass. The valley ice flows southeastwards towards the Rutford Ice Stream.

The feature is named after the medieval fortress of Sikera in southeastern Bulgaria.

Location
US mapping in 1988.

Maps
 Vinson Massif.  Scale 1:250 000 topographic map.  Reston, Virginia: US Geological Survey, 1988.
 Antarctic Digital Database (ADD). Scale 1:250000 topographic map of Antarctica. Scientific Committee on Antarctic Research (SCAR). Since 1993, regularly updated.

References
 Sikera Valley. SCAR Composite Antarctic Gazetteer
 Bulgarian Antarctic Gazetteer. Antarctic Place-names Commission. (details in Bulgarian, basic data in English)

External links
 Sikera Valley. Adjusted Copernix satellite image

Landforms of Ellsworth Land
Bulgaria and the Antarctic
Valleys of Antarctica